Adams College is a historic Christian mission school in South Africa, associated with the United Congregational Church of Southern Africa (UCCSA). The settlement there is known as Adams Mission. The college's alumni include Presidents of Botswana and Uganda, several ministers and leaders of the African National Congress. It is recognised as a historic school. It has been called Adams School, Amanzimtoti Institute and the Amanzimtoti Zulu Training School.

History
The school was founded in 1853 by the Reverend David Rood, missionary of the American Board of Commissioners for Foreign Missions. The school was located on the glebe of the Amanzimtoti mission and was initially named the Amanzimtoti Institute. Rood had arrived in Natal 20 January 1848 and subsequently established the Ifafa mission station. Rood then transferred to Amanzimtoti following the 16 September 1851 death of mission founder the Reverend Newton Adams, M.D. Adams was much revered and in the 1930s the school was renamed Adams College in his honour.

Adams had arrived in 1835 with two other missionaries, but after being rebuffed by the Thabethe tribe which employed local chiefs from numerous nguni clans one noticeable one was headed by inkosi Mtubantuba to donate cattle they had set out to establish three complementary missions. Adams had chosen a site south of Durban where he founded a "family school" within months of his arrival. The school attracted both adults and children. He was helped by an early convert called Mbalasi who was the widow of Duze Ka Mnengwa KaKhondlo. He had been a Chief of the Makanya killed during the wars with Shaka leaving Mbalasi to care for herself.  She and her son Nembula became part of the Adams home.

A historic meeting took place here in 1881 when the Reverend William Cullen Wilcox was asked to talk to a fatherless student called John Dube about his poor behavior at the school. John was the son of the Reverend James Dube who was the Congregational minister in Inanda. In 1887 John Dube was "adopted" by the Wilcoxes and taken to America to study at Oberlin College. Wilcox was to be eventually awarded with a medal by the South African government and Dube was to open his own school, his own newspaper and to be the first leader of what was to become the African National Congress.

In 1888 Dr. John Mavuma Nembula, a student from Adams, returned to the College from America. He had been sent to America to help with translating a Zulu Bible but he had stayed there and he had become a physician. He was the first Black South African to do this and for a while taught physiology at the college.

In 1924 Z.K. Matthews was appointed to be the first black head of Adams College where the activist Albert Luthuli was already a teacher. Both of them were active in politics and Matthews was later to be the Botswana Ambassador to the United Nations and Luthuli was to win the Nobel Peace Prize.

Between 1933 and 1945 Edgar Brookes was the Principal of Adams College. He worked closely with John Dube of Ohlange High School to achieve common objectives of improving the lot of native Africans. The school became one of the most important schools for black education.

In 1945 the school lost Edgar Brookes, and there was a period of unrest and poor discipline. In 1947 the main building of the school burned down. A new headmaster, Jack Grant, a white academic, arrived from Trinidad in 1948 to refocus the school. The school faced legal opposition from the government as the Bantu Education Act came into force. This act required that South African schools prepare black students for secondary and manual labour. Grant and the school felt that this was unacceptable and argued that they should be allowed to become independent. However the first President and the incumbent President of the ANC were staff from the school and the authorities were adamant. They allowed the nearby Inanda Seminary School to operate outside the act, but in 1956 the school held a service to mark the end of its operation. The school was sold to the government and the head left South Africa. The important item was the school was not able to be called "Adams". What was then thought to be the end of a leading school was described by ex-staff member George C. Grant in his book, The Liquidation of Adams College.

The school was renamed the Amanzimtoti Zulu Training School as the Bantu Education Act, 1953 finally came into effect. Bantu Education was a clearly divisive and paternalist racist campaign that was designed to educate black children for their lowly place in society. Academic subjects were not encouraged as this might deny the country the (black) manual labour it required. The school's name returned to "Adams" when Bantu education was abandoned.

During this period the school was poorly cared for during the Apartheid period and buildings were demolished. The school requires some work to achieve its previous successes but in 2007 the school achieved a 93% Matric pass rate in line with Thulani Khumalo the heads priority of "academic excellence".

Music

Both what is now Ohlange High School and Adams were involved with a move to return music to its ethnic roots. The move to a traditionalist approach was backed by John Dube who was at Ohlange and Brookes who was the headmaster here. Esau Fika Mthethwea who was a teacher formed the "Lucky Stars" in 1929 as an ethnic vaudeville troupe of typically eight young teachers who had been trained at Adams. Esau died in 1933 but others took over and the Lucky Stars toured throughout the country and they nearly had a tour of Europe.

Sport
The "Shooting Stars" are one of the oldest football teams in the Durban area. Football was introduced by the missionary schools and the Shooting Stars were able to challenge similar teams at Ifafa, Umbumbulu and Inanda. All of these teams were well established by 1902.

George Copeland Grant was on the teaching staff of Adams College where cricket had been introduced in the 1930s. As "Jackie" Grant he had captained the West Indies Cricket team for four tests before becoming a missionary teacher in 1939. When Grant arrived Ohlange High School already had an established team. Grant raised the status of the game around Durban and made Adams the centre of this new school sport. Cricket was the sport popular with the Indian immigrants to South Africa and the local Durban Indian Cricket Union dated from 1894.

Today
The mission station is called Adams Mission and it had a population of 600 in 2001.

In 2007 Adams College was amongst several schools recognised as "historic schools". Funding of six million rand a year was earmarked for Adams, Ohlange High School, Inkamana High School,  Inanda Seminary School and Vryheid Comprehensive High School to make them academies focussing on Maths, Science and Technology. Anglican Archbishop Emeritus Njongonkulu Ndungane said that they still needed funds and  "little has been achieved since democracy".

Alumni
 Mangosuthu Buthelezi - Prime Minister and political leader
 Herbert Chitepo - Chairman of the Zimbabwe African National Union
 Herbert Isaac Ernest Dhlomo - writer and poet
 Nkosazana Dlamini-Zuma - South African cabinet minister 
 John Dube - First ANC president and founder member
 Enoch Dumbutshena - first Zimbabwean Chief Justice; African descent 
 Pixley ka Isaka Seme - ANC founder
 Seretse Khama - President of Botswana
 Ellen Kuzwayo - President of the ANC Youth League 
 Pius Langa - South African Chief Justice
 Anton Lembede - First president of the ANC Youth League
 Albert Lutuli - leader of the ANC and Nobel Laureate
 Epainette Mbeki - mother of former president Thabo Mbeki of South Africa
Zephania Mothopeng - President of the Pan-Africanist Congress
 Oscar Mpetha
 Es'kia Mphahlele (1919-2008) - writer and teacher
 Thomas Nkobi - ANC Treasurer General 1973–1994
 Joshua Nkomo - Vice-President of Zimbabwe 
 Milton Obote - president of Uganda
 Stanlake J. W. T. Samkange - educationalist, author, historian
 Stella Sigcau - South African cabinet minister
 Sizwe C.Sabelo - South African Process Engineers, Owner of Virtual Is Reality.

Notable staff
 Edgar Brookes - transformed the school and was an ambassador to the United Nations
 George Copeland "Jackie" Grant - West Indies bowler and cricket captain
 John Dube - started his own school and newspaper
 Albert Lutuli - Nobel Peace Prize winner
 Z.K. Matthews - headmaster; became the Ambassador to the United States for Botswana

References

Schools in KwaZulu-Natal
Unaccredited institutions of higher learning